Wicomico is an unincorporated community in Gloucester County, in the U. S. state of Virginia.

The local historic home Timberneck was added to the National Register of Historic Places in 1979.

References

Unincorporated communities in Virginia
Unincorporated communities in Gloucester County, Virginia